Alonso de Aragón or Alfonso de Aragón (1468 – 24 February 1520) was Archbishop of Zaragoza, Archbishop of Valencia and Lieutenant General of Aragon. Born in Cervera, he was an illegitimate son of Ferdinand II of Aragon by a Catalan noblewoman called Aldonza Ruiz de Ivorra (1452–1516). In his youth his tutor was Antonio Geraldini, brother of the humanist scholar Alessandro Geraldini.

Ecclesiastical career 
Alonso was more a politician than a clergyman. His ecclesiastical career was determined by his father when he was five years old; his half-uncle, Juan de Aragón, Archbishop of Zaragoza and illegitimate son of King John II of Aragon, died. Ferdinand II decided that Alonso would succeed him, but Pope Sixtus IV thought that he was too young and appointed Ausías de Puggio. By 1478, the Pope couldn't withstand the pressure any more and appointed Alonso as new Archbishop on 14 August. However, he was not ordained as a priest until 7 November 1501, a day before being ordained as a bishop.

On 23 January 1512, Alonso was appointed Archbishop of Valencia. He was enthroned as such on 4 April 1512.

Political career 
His father made him Lieutenant General of the Kingdom of Naples in 1507, to replace Gonzalo Fernández de Córdoba. In 1512, he was in command of the troops that conquered Tudela in the Spanish conquest of Iberian Navarre.

When his father died in 1516, the Archbishop was appointed by his will as Lieutenant General of Aragon and de facto ruler of Aragon, due to the insanity of his half-sister, Queen Joanna, who inherited the crown. When Joanna's son and co-ruler, Charles I, arrived in November 1518, the Archbishop was confirmed as Lieutenant General of Aragon. He died two years later in Lécera.

Aragón also realised important modifications on the La Seo Cathedral, where he was buried.

Issue 
Despite being Archbishop, Alonso had seven children with Ana de Gurrea (1470–1527), including:

 Juan (1498–1530), next Archbishop of Zaragoza
 Hernando (1498–1575), also Archbishop of Zaragoza and Viceroy of Aragón
 Antonio (died 1552), Lord of Quinto
 Juana (died 1520), married to Juan de Borja, 3rd Duke of Gandía and mother of Saint Francis Borgia
 Martin, Lord of Argavieso
 Ana, married the 5th and the 6th Duke of Medina Sidonia

Arms

References 

 ancestry.com: Alonso of ARAGON
  Fundación Casa Ducal de Medinaceli: Alonso de Aragón "Gran Bastardo de Aragón"
  rodovid.org: Alonso de Aragón y Ruiz de Ivorra n. 1470 d. 24 febrero 1520
  Aldonza de Ivorra - Wikipedia, la enciclopedia libre
 PhiloBiblon: Alfonso de Aragón y Ruiz de Ivorra

External links 
Archbishop Alfonso de Aragón

1470 births
1520 deaths
Illegitimate children of Spanish monarchs
Archbishops of Zaragoza
Archbishops of Valencia
Aragonese regents
Viceroys of Aragon
Alonso
House of Trastámara
Sons of kings